This is a List of S. H. Kress and Co. buildings that are notable.  This includes buildings named Kress Building or variations.  Notable historic S. H. Kress & Co. structures include:
 S. H. Kress and Co. Building (Augusta, Georgia)
 S. H. Kress and Co. Building (Anniston, Alabama), listed on the NRHP in Calhoun County, Alabama in 1985
 S. H. Kress Building (Albuquerque, New Mexico), NRHP-listed in 1984
 S. H. Kress and Co. Building (Alexandria, Louisiana)
 S. H. Kress and Co. Building (Altoona, Pennsylvania)
 S. H. Kress and Co. Building (Amarillo, Texas)
 S. H. Kress and Co. Building (Americus, Georgia)
 S. H. Kress and Co. Building (Ardmore, Oklahoma)
 S. H. Kress and Co. Building (Asheville, North Carolina), NRHP-listed as part of the Downtown Asheville Historic District
 S. H. Kress and Co. Building (Athens, Georgia)
 S. H. Kress and Co. Building (Atlanta, Georgia)
 S. H. Kress and Co. Building (Bakersfield, California)
 S. H. Kress and Co. Building (Bartlesville, Oklahoma)
 S. H. Kress and Co. Building (Baton Rouge, Louisiana), listed on the NRHP in Louisiana in 2006
 S. H. Kress and Co. Building (Berkeley, California)
 S. H. Kress and Co. Building (Bessemer, Alabama)
 S. H. Kress and Co. Building (Billings, Montana)
 S. H. Kress and Co. Building (Biloxi, Mississippi)
 S. H. Kress and Company Building (Birmingham, Alabama) 1 of 3. 301 19th Street. 
 S. H. Kress and Company Building (Birmingham, Alabama), listed on the NRHP in Alabama in 1982 2 of 3. 1910-1914 2nd Avenue. 
 S. H. Kress and Company Building (Birmingham, Alabama) 3 of 3. 3001 27th Street. 
 S. H. Kress and Co. Building (Blytheville, Arkansas), listed on the NRHP in Mississippi County, Arkansas In 1997
 S. H. Kress and Co. Building (Bristol, Tennessee)
 S. H. Kress and Co. Building (Brownsville, Texas)
 S. H. Kress and Co. Building (Brunswick, Georgia)
 S. H. Kress and Co. Building (Cairo, Illinois)
 S. H. Kress and Co. Building (Calexio, California)
 S. H. Kress and Co. Building (Charleston, South Carolina)
 S. H. Kress and Co. Building (Chanute, Kansas)
 S. H. Kress and Co. Building (Columbia, Missouri), NRHP-listed in 2005
 S. H. Kress and Co. Building (Columbia, South Carolina), NRHP-listed in 1979
 S. H. Kress and Co. Building (Columbus, Georgia), listed on the NRHP in Georgia in 1980
 S. H. Kress and Co. Building (Corpus Christi, Texas)
 S. H. Kress and Co. Building (Daytona Beach, Florida), NRHP-listed in 1983 and again in 1988
 S. H. Kress and Co. Building (Del Rio, Texas)
 S. H. Kress Building (Denison, Texas)
 S. H. Kress and Co. Building (Denver, Colorado)
 S. H. Kress and Co. Building (Dothan, Alabama), NRHP-listed as part of the Main Street Commercial District (Dothan, Alabama) in 1983.
 S. H. Kress and Co. Building (Durham, North Carolina)
 S. H. Kress and Co. Building (Eagle Pass, Texas)
 S. H. Kress and Co. Building (East Orange, New Jersey)
 S. H. Kress and Co. Building (Elizabethton, Tennessee)
 S. H. Kress Building (El Paso, Texas)
 S. H. Kress and Co. Building (Emporia, Kansas), listed on the NRHP in Kansas in 1983
 S. H. Kress and Co. Building (Enid, Oklahoma)
 S. H. Kress and Co. Building (Fairbanks, Alaska)
 S. H. Kress and Co. Building (Fayetteville, North Carolina)
 S. H. Kress and Co. Building (Florence, South Carolina)
 S. H. Kress and Co. Building (Fort Myers, Florida)
 S. H. Kress and Co. Building (Fort Scott, Kansas)
 S. H. Kress and Co. Building (Fort Smith, Arkansas)
 S. H. Kress and Co. Building (Fort Worth, Texas), NRHP-listed in 2007
 S. H. Kress and Co. Building (Fresno, California)
 S. H. Kress and Co. Building (Gadsden, Alabama)
 S. H. Kress and Co. Building (Galveston, Texas)
 S. H. Kress and Co. Building (Gastonia, North Carolina)
 S. H. Kress and Co. Building (Goldsboro, North Carolina)
 S. H. Kress and Co. Building (Grand Junction, Colorado)
 S. H. Kress and Co. Building (Great Falls, Montana)
 S. H. Kress and Co. Building (Greeley, Colorado)
 S. H. Kress and Co. Building (Greensboro, North Carolina)
 S. H. Kress and Co. Building (Greenville, South Carolina)
 S. H. Kress and Co. Building (Greenville, Texas)
 S. H. Kress and Co. Building (Guthrie, Oklahoma)
 S. H. Kress and Co. Building (Hattiesburg, Mississippi), involved U.S. Supreme Court Case [the linked page is for a SCOTUS case not this building]
 S. H. Kress and Co. Building (Helena, Arkansas)
 S. H. Kress and Co. Building (Hillsboro, Texas)
 S. H. Kress and Co. Building (Hilo, Hawaii)
 S. H. Kress and Co. Building (Hot Springs, Arkansas)
 S. H. Kress and Co. Building (Houston), NRHP-listed in 2002
 S. H. Kress and Co. Building (Huntsville, Alabama), listed on the NRHP in Alabama in 1980
 S. H. Kress and Co. Building (Hutchinson, Kansas)
 S. H. Kress and Co. Building (Idaho Falls, Idaho), listed on the NRHP in Idaho in 1984
 S. H. Kress and Co. Building (Inglewood, California)
 S. H. Kress and Co. Building (Iola, Kansas)
 S. H. Kress and Co. Building (Jacksonville, Florida)
 S. H. Kress and Co. Building (Johnson City, Tennessee), Currently owned by Allied Dispatch Solutions, LLC
 S. H. Kress and Co. Building (Key West, Florida)
 S. H. Kress and Co. Building (Knoxville, Tennessee)
 S. H. Kress and Co. Building (La Grange, Florida)
 S. H. Kress and Co. Building (Lakeland, Florida)
 S. H. Kress and Co. Building (Laredo, Texas)
 S. H. Kress and Co. Building (Laurel, Mississippi)
 S. H. Kress and Co. Building (Lawrence, Kansas)
 S. H. Kress and Co. Building (Little Rock, Arkansas)
 S. H. Kress and Co. Building (Long Beach, California), listed among the Long Beach historic landmarks
 S. H. Kress and Co. Building (Longview, Texas)
 S. H. Kress and Co. Building (Los Angeles, California) 1 of 5. 8617 Broadway.
 S. H. Kress and Co. Building (Los Angeles, California) 2 of 5. 629 South Broadway. 
 S. H. Kress and Co. Building (Los Angeles, California) 3 of 5. 5350 Wilshire Boulevard. 
 S. H. Kress and Co. Building (Los Angeles, California) 4 of 5. 4601 South Broadway. 
 S. H. Kress and Co. Building (Los Angeles, California) 5 of 5. 6608 Hollywood Boulevard. 
 S. H. Kress and Co. Building (Lubbock, Texas), NRHP-listed in 1992
 S. H. Kress and Co. Building (Macon, Georgia)
 S. H. Kress and Co. Building (Memphis, Tennessee), listed on the NRHP in Tennessee
 S. H. Kress and Co. Building (Meridian, Mississippi)
 S. H. Kress and Co. Building (Miami, Florida)
 S. H. Kress and Co. Building (Miami Beach, Florida)
 S. H. Kress and Co. Building (Mobile, Alabama)
 S. H. Kress and Co. Building (Modesto, California)
 S. H. Kress and Co. Building (Montgomery, Alabama)
 S. H. Kress and Co. Building (Muskogee, Oklahoma)
 S. H. Kress and Co. Building (Nashville, Tennessee)
 S. H. Kress and Co. Building (Natchez, Mississippi)
 S. H. Kress and Co. Building (New Bern, North Carolina)
 S. H. Kress and Co. Building (New Orleans, Louisiana)
 S. H. Kress and Co. Building (NYC, New York) 1 of 3. 444 5th Avenue.
 S. H. Kress and Co. Building (NYC, New York) 2 of 3. 256-258 West 125th Street. 
 S. H. Kress and Co. Building (NYC, New York) 3 of 3. 1915 3rd Avenue.
 S. H. Kress & Co. Building (Nogales, Arizona), listed on the NRHP in Arizona in 1985
 S. H. Kress and Co. Building (Oakland, California)
 S. H. Kress and Co. Building (Oklahoma City, Oklahoma)
 S. H. Kress and Co. Building (Okmulgee, Oklahoma)
 S. H. Kress and Co. Building (Orangeburg, South Carolina)
 S. H. Kress and Co. Building (Orlando, Florida), 1936, Art Deco design
 S. H. Kress and Co. Building (Paris, Texas)
 S. H. Kress and Co. Building (Parsons, Kansas)
 S. H. Kress and Co. Building (Pasadena, California)
 S. H. Kress and Co. Building (Pine Bluff, Arkansas)
 S. H. Kress and Co. Building (Pittsburg, Kansas)
 S. H. Kress and Co. Building (Pocatello, Idaho)
 S. H. Kress and Co. Building (Pomona, California)
 S. H. Kress and Co. Building (Ponca City, Oklahoma)
 S. H. Kress and Co. Building (Port Arthur, Texas)
 S. H. Kress and Co. Building (Portland, Oregon), NRHP-listed in 1996
 S. H. Kress and Co. Building (Provo, Utah)
 S. H. Kress and Co. Building (Pueblo, Colorado)
 S. H. Kress and Co. Building (Richmond, California)
 S. H. Kress and Co. Building (Riverside, California)
 S. H. Kress and Co. Building (Roanoke, Virginia)
 S. H. Kress and Co. Building (Rockford, Illinois)
 S. H. Kress and Co. Building (Rocky Mount, North Carolina)
 S. H. Kress and Co. Building (Rome, Georgia)
 S. H. Kress and Co. Building (Roswell, New Mexico)
 S. H. Kress and Co. Building (Sacramento, California)
 S. H. Kress and Co. Building (St. Petersburg, Florida), NRHP-listed in 2001
 S. H. Kress and Co. Building (Salina, Kansas)
 S. H. Kress and Co. Building (Salisbury, North Carolina)
 S. H. Kress and Co. Building (Salt Lake City, Utah)
 S. H. Kress and Co. Building (San Antonio, Texas) 1 of 2. 311-315 East Houston Street. 
 S. H. Kress and Co. Building (San Antonio, Texas) 2 of 2. 149 West Commerce Street. 
 S. H. Kress and Co. Building (San Pedro, California)
 S. H. Kress and Co. Building (Santa Rosa, California)
 S. H. Kress and Co. Building (Sapulpa, Oklahoma)
 S. H. Kress and Co. Building (Sarasota, Florida), NRHP-listed in 1984
 S. H. Kress and Co. Building (Savannah, Georgia)
 S. H. Kress and Co. Building (Seattle, Washington)  1 of 3. 1419-1431 3rd Avenue. 
 S. H. Kress and Co. Building (Seattle, Washington) 2 of 3. 2220 NW Market Street.
 S. H. Kress and Co. Building (Seattle, Washington) 3 of 3. 4546 California Ave SW.
 S. H. Kress and Co. Building (Selma, Alabama)
 S. H. Kress and Co. Building (Shawnee, Oklahoma)
 S. H. Kress and Co. Building (Sherman, Texas)
 S. H. Kress and Co. Building (Spartanburg, South Carolina), NRHP-listed as part of the Spartanburg Historic District
 S. H. Kress and Co. Building (Spokane, Washington)
 S. H. Kress & Co. Building (Stockton, California), 1930
 S. H. Kress and Co. Building (Tacoma, Washington)
 S. H. Kress and Co. Building (Tampa, Florida), NRHP-listed in 1983
 S. H. Kress and Co. Building (Texarkana, Texas)
 S. H. Kress and Co. Building (Trinidad, Colorado)
 S. H. Kress and Co. Building (Tulsa, Oklahoma)
 S. H. Kress & Co. Building (Tuscaloosa, Alabama)
 S. H. Kress and Co. Building (Tyler, Texas)
 S. H. Kress and Co. Building (Waco, Texas)
 S. H. Kress and Co. Building (Waycross, Georgia)
 S. H. Kress and Co. Building (Wenatchee, Washington)
 S. H. Kress Company Building (Wichita, Kansas), listed on the NRHP in Kansas in 1985
 S. H. Kress and Co. Building (Wilmington, North Carolina)
 S. H. Kress and Co. Building (Ybor City, Florida)
 S. H. Kress and Co. Building (Youngstown, Ohio), listed on the NRHP in Ohio in 1986
 S. H. Kress and Co. Building (Yuma, Arizona)

See also

 George R. Kress House, Los Angeles, CA
Kresge Building (disambiguation)

S. H. Kress
S. H. Kress & Co.